Ghost Station is a 2007 Thai comedy-horror film directed by Yuthlert Sippapak as a spoof of Brokeback Mountain.

Plot
Udd and Yai are a gay couple who love cowboy films and move from the city to a rural area to have a more intimate, rustic setting for their relationship. They buy an abandoned filling station and look to settle down. Udd then finds that Yai is having an affair with Tangmo, a local woman who has a lesbian lover, Jenny. Neither Yai nor Tangmo are aware of either of their sexual histories, but Udd discovers the affair and plans to have anal sex with his grandfather out of revenge. However, none of them know that he is a zombie, and lives with some scary spirits.

Cast
 Kerttisak Udomnak as Udd
 Nakorn Silachai as Yai
 Achita Sik-kamana as Tangmo
 Supassra Ruangwong as Jenny

Production
After his previous film, Krasue Valentine, director-screenwriter Yuthlert Sippapak was in the process of developing his next project when he was on Khaosan Road in Bangkok when he had a chance meeting with comedian Nakorn Silachai and the two came up with the concept of Ghost Station.

"Ghost Station is a pure comedy," Yuthlert said in production notes for the film. "Most of my previous works have been mixed-genre films with comedy as a part of the overall concept ... Ghost Station will be my first-ever film using comedy as the main focal point and horror or romance for subplots."

References

External links
 Official site 
 

2000s ghost films
2000s parody films
2000s supernatural films
2007 LGBT-related films
2007 comedy films
2007 comedy horror films
2007 films
2007 horror films
Films set in abandoned houses
Gay-related films
LGBT-related comedy horror films
Sahamongkol Film International films
Supernatural comedy films
Thai LGBT-related films
Thai comedy horror films
Thai ghost films
Thai supernatural horror films
Thai-language films